The 2008 WNBA Playoffs was the postseason for the Women's National Basketball Association's 2008 season which ended with the Eastern Conference champion Detroit Shock defeating the Western Conference champion San Antonio Silver Stars 3-0.

Format
The top 4 teams from each conference qualify for the playoffs.
All 4 teams are seeded by basis of their standings.
The series for rounds one and two are in a best-of-three format with Games 2 and 3 on the home court of the team with the higher seed.
The series for the WNBA Finals is in a best-of-five format with Games 1, 2 and 5 on the home court of the team with the higher seed.
Reseeding (as used in the Stanley Cup Playoffs) is not in use: therefore, all playoff matchups are predetermined via the teams' seedings.

Playoff qualifying

Eastern Conference
The following teams clinched a playoff berth in the East:
Detroit Shock (22–12)
Connecticut Sun (21–13)
New York Liberty (19–15)
Indiana Fever (17–17)

Western Conference
The following teams clinched a playoff berth in the West:
 San Antonio Silver Stars (24–10)
 Seattle Storm (22–12)
 Los Angeles Sparks (20–14)
 Sacramento Monarchs (18–16)

Bracket
This was the outlook for the 2008 WNBA playoffs. Teams in italics had home court advantage. Teams in bold advanced to the next round.  Numbers to the left of each team indicate the team's original playoffs seeding in their respective conferences.  Numbers to the right of each team indicate the number of games the team won in that round.

Eastern Conference

First round

(1) Detroit Shock vs. (4) Indiana Fever

(2) Connecticut Sun vs. (3) New York Liberty

Conference finals

(1) Detroit Shock vs. (3) New York Liberty

Western Conference

First round

(1) San Antonio Silver Stars vs. (4) Sacramento Monarchs

(2) Seattle Storm vs. (3) Los Angeles Sparks

Conference finals

(1) San Antonio Silver Stars vs. (3) Los Angeles Sparks

WNBA Finals: San Antonio Silver Stars vs. Detroit Shock

References

Playoffs
Women's National Basketball Association Playoffs